Marcia J. Bates (born 1942) is Professor VI Emerita of Information Studies in the Graduate School of Education and Information Studies, University of California, Los Angeles.

Career
Bates received a  M.L.S in 1967 and a Ph.D (1972), both from the University of California, Berkeley.

She previously taught at the University of Maryland, College Park and was tenured at the University of Washington in 1981 before joining the faculty at UCLA. Bates has published on information seeking behavior, search strategy, subject access in manual and automated systems, and user-centered design of information retrieval systems. She is an elected Fellow of the American Association for the Advancement of Science, a recipient of the American Society for Information Science Research Award, 1998, Award of Merit, 2005, and has twice received the American Society for Information Science "Best Journal of ASIS Paper of the Year Award," in 1980 and 2000. In 2001 she received the Frederick G. Kilgour Award for Research in Library and Information Technology.

Bates' early work dealt with searching success and failure in library catalogs.  She initially became known for her articles on information search tactics, that is, techniques and heuristics for improving retrieval success in information systems.

She was Editor-in-Chief  of the  Third Edition of the Encyclopedia of Library and Information Sciences (Taylor & Francis, 2010).

Research
Many of Bates' contributions have been in the area of user-centered information system design. Several of her papers have been widely cited and used, including articles on her concepts of "berrypicking," of "information search tactics," and the "cascade of interactions" in the user-system interface. In 2017, Ali Shiri did an extensive analysis of Bates' major articles, determining who cited her work and why. He found that she had had considerable impact on information system design.

In conjunction with the Getty Research Institute, and other Getty agencies, she has studied humanities information seeking online extensively, producing six articles on the work. In subject access, as early as 1985, she designed and argued for a "cluster thesaurus" that would bring together all the syntactic and semantic variants of a concept under each concept. Searches could then match on any term in the cluster, with the searcher able to select subsets of terms for further searching. This was also known as the "front-end system mind."

Bates takes an evolutionary approach to the development of human and animal information and knowledge. She argues that "information is the pattern of organization of matter and energy." The recognition and transmission of these patterns has developed evolutionarily, leading to the point where human beings have become able to recognize quite sophisticated patterns, such as language constructions, and patterns of behavior such as "bait and switch." She also defines types of information useful for the information professions, such as "embodied information," "encoded information," "embedded information," and "recorded information." which marks a change from the definition of information in communication theory. The communication model sees information as the flow and exchange of a message, originating from one speaker, mind, or source and received by another. According to Ronald Day, "Implicit in this standard model of information are such notions as the intentionality of the speaker, the self-evident 'presence' of that intention in his or her words, a set of hearers or users who receive the information and who demonstrate the correctness of that reception in action or use, and the freedom of choice in regards to the speaker's ability to say one thing rather than another, as well as even the receivers freedom of choice to receive one message rather than another in the marketplace of ideas."

Bates claims (drawing on S. Goonatilake) that there are three fundamental channels of information: genetic, neural-cultural, and exosomatic.

In response to the rapid transformations in libraries and in information science, Bates has also written on the nature of the information disciplines. The design of the encyclopedia she and Maack edited also reflects her arguments about the nature of the information disciplines.

According to Google Scholar Bates' work has been cited over 10,000 times. Cronin & Meho found that she ranked 3rd in a list of 31 influential information scientists.

References

External links
 Bates' Faculty Website
UCLA Department of Information Studies

UCLA Graduate School of Education and Information Studies faculty
1942 births
Living people
University of California, Berkeley School of Information alumni
Pomona College alumni